Arnold Barry Latman (May 21, 1936 – April 28, 2019) was an American professional All Star Major League Baseball pitcher.

Early and personal life
Latman was born in Los Angeles, California, and was Jewish. Latman would not pitch on the Jewish High Holidays. His parents were Nathan (a furniture auctioneer) and Elsie (Snitzer) Latman. He had two younger sisters, Ann Lorraine and Carolee. When he was 10 years old, his parents required that he stop playing baseball for three years, to leave himself time to study for his bar mitzvah. He was nicknamed “Shoulders.” He died on April 28, 2019 in Richmond, Texas.

High school and college
He attended Fairfax High School, pitching for the baseball team, and playing alongside future major leaguer Larry Sherry. He threw a perfect game in 1954, and was named the Los Angeles All-City Player by the Helms Athletic Foundation.  He then attended the University of Southern California on a baseball scholarship.

Career
In the minor leagues in 1955 he pitched in Waterloo, Iowa for the Waterloo White Hawks, in the Class-B Three-I League, and was 18–5 with an earned run average of 4.12, leading the league in innings pitched, and with his 18 wins one behind league leader Mudcat Grant. In 1956, he pitched for the Memphis Chicks in the Double-A Southern Association, and was 14–14 with a 3.85 earned run average. In 1957 he pitched for the Indianapolis Indians of the Triple-A American Association, going 13–13 with an earned-run average of 3.95, and in three starts for the team the following year he was 3–0 with a 0.76 ERA.

Latman played all or part of 11 seasons in the majors, from 1957 until 1967, for the Chicago White Sox, Cleveland Indians, Los Angeles/California Angels, and Houston Astros.

In 1959 he was 6th in the American League in strikeouts per 9 innings pitched (5.596). In 1961 he was 4th in the AL with a .722 winning percentage, as he went 13–5 for the Indians. Latman was an All Star in both 1961 and 1962.

In 1997 he was inducted into the Southern California Jewish Sports Hall of Fame.

Through 2010, Latman was 6th all-time in career strikeouts (directly behind Jason Marquis), and 8th in games (344; directly behind Sandy Koufax) and wins (59; directly behind Erskine Mayer) among Jewish major league baseball players.

See also
List of select Jewish baseball players

References

External links
, or Retrosheet, or RIP Baseball, or SABR Biography Project
Barry Latman at Find a Grave

1936 births
2019 deaths
Baseball players from Los Angeles
Burials at Hollywood Forever Cemetery
Chicago White Sox players
Cleveland Indians players
Houston Astros players
Indianapolis Indians players
Jewish American baseball players
Jewish Major League Baseball players
Los Angeles Angels players
Major League Baseball pitchers
Memphis Chickasaws players
Oklahoma City 89ers players
Rapiños de Occidente players
Seattle Angels players
USC Trojans baseball players
Waterloo White Hawks players
Memphis Chicks players
21st-century American Jews
Fairfax High School (Los Angeles) alumni